Bromiades brachyptera is a species of beetle in the family Cerambycidae, the only species in the genus Bromiades.

References

Rhinotragini
Monotypic Cerambycidae genera